Waman Marka (Quechua waman falcon, marka village, Hispanicized spelling Huamanmarca) is a mountain in the Andes of Peru which reaches an altitude of approximately . It is located in the Junín Region, Yauli Province, La Oroya District, southeast of La Oroya.

References

Mountains of Peru
Mountains of Junín Region